The Impressionists is a 2006 three-part factual docudrama from the BBC, which reconstructs the origins of the Impressionist art movement. Based on archive letters, records and interviews from the time, the series records the lives of the artists who were to transform the art world.

Narrative
The Impressionists is a tale of motivation, creation, poverty, hope, and of the struggle for recognition, set against a backdrop of war, revolution and Parisian artistic movements.

At the heart of the story is the brotherhood of artists, bonded by enduring friendships and their commitment to a new type of art.  The story is led by the paintings. Some of the world's most memorable art works are recreated, following the same techniques that the artists used at the time.

The series reveals how Claude Monet, in a race against time to capture the light, took just 40 minutes to paint his seminal work Impression, Sunrise; why Édouard Manet's depiction of Olympia, in which his model brazenly gazes out of the canvas, so outraged Parisian society; and how Paul Cézanne's 60 paintings of one mountain, Montagne Saint-Victoire, helped to lay the foundations for Cubism and modern art.

Julian Glover plays 80-year-old Monet, the "Father of Impressionism" and narrator of the series. He undertakes a nostalgic but sometimes painful journey as he looks back on his past life in an interview with a journalist conducted at his garden, pond and home in Giverny.

Monet remembers arriving as a young man in Paris in 1862, full of dreams about a new kind of art. Young Monet, played by Richard Armitage, leads the group of friends with his vision for paintings that capture the images, energy and light of the modern world.

In the drama, Monet describes his fellow artists, friends and supporters with whom he painted, struggled from poverty with and shared experiences, thoughts and art: 
Frédéric Bazille, played by James Lance, the little-known genius who died too soon to enjoy the movement's success but who inspired its first exhibition; Pierre-Auguste Renoir, played by Charlie Condou, an irrepressible lover and painter of women; Édouard Manet, played by Andrew Havill, whose work was Monet's first inspiration but was censored by society; Edgar Degas, played by Aden Gillett, who captured the back stage reality of the ballet world; and Paul Cézanne, played by Will Keen, whose innovative work determined the path of modern art. Amanda Root plays Alice Hoschedé, Monet's great love. 
 
Using quotes from the primary sources, the series depicts the characters' idiosyncrasies—Cézanne's hatred of barking dogs, his mistress Hortense's love of lemonade, Monet's flamboyant dress sense, and Degas' irritability.

Production 
It was shot on location in Provence and Normandy, at Claude Monet's home and garden at Giverny and at locations in the UK.

The series was filmed with the Panasonic SDX 900 DVCPRO 50 professional camcorder in widescreen 25fps progressive mode.

Missing artists 
The drama does not include several main impressionist artists such as Gustave Caillebotte, Mary Cassatt, Armand Guillaumin, Berthe Morisot, Alfred Sisley, and Camille Pissarro (Pissarro is the only artist to have shown his work at all eight Paris Impressionist exhibitions).

External links
 

2006 British television series debuts
2006 British television series endings
2000s British drama television series
BBC high definition shows
BBC television docudramas
Impressionism
British television miniseries
English-language television shows
Cultural depictions of Claude Monet
Cultural depictions of Pierre-Auguste Renoir
Cultural depictions of 19th-century painters
Cultural depictions of Edgar Degas
Cultural depictions of Édouard Manet